Balut-e Karavan (also Romanized as Balūţ-e Kāravān, Balūt-e Kārevān, and Balūţ Kāravān; also known as Balūk-e Kāravān) is a village in Kabgian Rural District, Kabgian District, Dana County, Kohgiluyeh and Boyer-Ahmad Province, Iran. At the 2006 census, its population was 97, in 25 families.

References 

Populated places in Dana County